Russian Formula 1600 Championship was a Russian formula racing competition that was held in 1996–2007.

Champions
All teams and drivers were Russian-registered

External links
 Russian Formula 1600/Formula 3 official website 
 Autoreview newspaper archive 

Formula racing series
Auto racing series in Russia
National championships in Russia